Philip Wenman, 6th Viscount Wenman (23 November 1719 – 16 August 1760), was a British landowner and politician.

He was the elder son of Richard Wenman, 5th Viscount Wenman, and Susanna Wenman (née Wroughton, daughter of Seymour Wroughton of Heskett). 

He succeeded his father in the viscountcy in 1729, aged eleven. As the viscountcy was an Irish title, it did not entitle him to a seat in the English House of Lords.

Education
Lord Wenman was educated at Roysse's School (from 1731–1737) and Oriel College, Oxford. He was a Steward of the OA Club in 1744.

Career
In 1749, Wenman was returned to the House of Commons for the city of Oxford, a seat he held until 1754. 

In 1754, he was returned as a Tory for the county of Oxfordshire in a bitterly contested election. However, there was a double return and, on 23rd April 1755, Whig candidates Lord Parker and Sir Edward Turner were declared elected in favour of Wenman and Sir James Dashwood.

Family 
Lord Wenman married Sophia, eldest daughter and co-heir of James Herbert, of Tythorpe, Oxfordshire, in 1741. They had four sons and three daughters. Their second son was Thomas Wenman. Wenman died in August 1760, aged 40, and was succeeded in the viscountcy by his eldest son, Philip.

See also
 List of Old Abingdonians

References

1719 births
1760 deaths
Viscounts in the Peerage of Ireland
Members of the Parliament of Great Britain for English constituencies
British MPs 1747–1754
People educated at Abingdon School